Maybe It's Live is a live album by Robert Palmer, released in 1982. It combines six live tracks of old songs with four new songs recorded in the studio, including "Some Guys Have All the Luck", which was a hit for Palmer in the UK, peaking at No. 16 on the UK Singles Chart.

The album peaked at No. 23 in Sweden and No. 92 in the Netherlands.

Track listing
All songs by Robert Palmer except where noted.
 "Sneakin' Sally Through the Alley" (Allen Toussaint) – 4:07
 "What's It Take?" – 2:54
 "Best of Both Worlds" – 3:06
 "Every Kinda People" (Andy Fraser) – 4:17
 "Bad Case of Loving You (Doctor, Doctor)" (Moon Martin) – 4:04
 "Some Guys Have All the Luck" (Jeff Fortgang) – 3:09
 "Style Kills" (Gary Numan, Robert Palmer) – 4:16
 "Si Chatouilleux" – 4:34
 "Maybe It's You" (David Ian Ainsworth, Danny Wilde) – 3:43
 "What Do You Care" – 2:20

Tracks #1-5 & 10 recorded live.

Personnel
 Robert Palmer – vocals; bass on "Style Kills" and "Si Chatouillieux"; drums, keyboards and guitar on "Si Chatouillieux"
 Alan Mansfield – guitar (1-5, 7, 10), keyboards (1-6, 9, 10)
 Chris Bishop – bass (1-6, 10)
 Jack Waldman – keyboards (1-6, 9, 10)
 Michael Dawe – drums (1-5, 10)
 Donny Wynn – drums (6, 7, 9)
 Adrian Belew – guitar on "Si Chatouillieux"
 Kenny Mazur - guitar on "Some Guys Have All the Luck"
 Danny Wilder - bass and guitar on "Maybe It's You"
 Gary Numan - keyboards on "Style Kills"

Production
 Produced and Arranged by Robert Palmer 
 Executive Producer – David Harper
 Engineers – Rhett Davies and Jack Nuber
 Assistant Engineer – Harold Dorsett
 Mixed by Jack Nuber at Compass Point Studios (New Providence, Bahamas).
 Mastered by Ted Jensen at Sterling Sound (New York, NY).
 Photography and Design – Graham Hughes
 Sculpture – Paul Wunderlich

Charts

References

Robert Palmer (singer) albums
Albums produced by Robert Palmer (singer)
1982 live albums
Island Records live albums